Enquelga (in Aymara: place of ashes) is a Chilean town. It is a highland Aymara town. Two other smaller communities also belong to this town, Caraguano and Chapicollo. The town has several hot springs which connect to the Isluga River.

References 

Populated places in Tarapacá Region
Communes of Chile